Henry William Ford (11 June 1884 – 26 November 1957) was an Australian rules footballer who played with Essendon in the Victorian Football League (VFL).

Notes

External links 

1884 births
1957 deaths
Australian rules footballers from Melbourne
Essendon Football Club players
People from Carlton, Victoria